Cicindela flexuosa is a species of tiger beetle in the large genus Cicindela.

References

flexuosa
Beetles described in 1758
Taxa named by Carl Linnaeus